Cremorne Gardens was the name of two pleasure gardens established in England and Australia in the mid 19th century by James Ellis .

 Cremorne Gardens, London, established in 1846
 Cremorne Gardens, Melbourne, Australia, established in 1853
 Cremorne Gardens, Sydney, Australia established in 1856
 original name of the Cremorne Theatre, Brisbane, Queensland, Australia
 Cremorne Gardens, established in the 19th century in Herne Bay, New Zealand

See also
 Cremorne (disambiguation)
 Cremorna Garden